Harald Trap Friis (22 February 1893 – 15 June 1976), who published as H. T. Friis, was a Danish-American radio engineer whose work at Bell Laboratories included pioneering contributions to radio propagation, radio astronomy, and radar. His two Friis formulas remain widely used.

Background
Friis was born in Næstved, Denmark. In 1916 received his electrical engineering degree from the Technical University of Denmark. After a stint at the Royal Gun Factory, in 1919 he received a Columbia University fellowship to study radio engineering under John H. Morecroft. In 1920 Friis joined a Western Electric Company research group which in 1925 became part of Bell Laboratories. There he remained for his entire professional career.

Career
Friis' first important publications were his 1923 Institute of Radio Engineers (IRE) paper on radio transmission measurements, 1925 IRE paper on directional antennas, and 1928 IRE paper on oscillographic observations of propagation phenomena. These papers documented studies of field strength and noise over a wide range of frequencies and stressed the importance of the signal-to-noise ratio (SNR) in receivers rather than simple field strength.

During the early 1930s Friis helped design the radio receiver used by Karl Jansky for radio astronomy, and with Edmond Bruce invented the rhombic antenna widely used for shortwave communications. In 1938 Friis became the director of the Holmdel Radio Laboratory developing microwave systems, where he and Alfred C. Beck designed the horn reflector antenna, which was widely used in AT&T's national microwave relay network in the 1960s. During World War II, Friis invented a "rocking horse" mechanical scanner for radar used to locate enemy mortars. He also authorized research into the first germanium diodes (Teal, 1942).

In 1946 Friis published his well-known analytic formula for transmission loss, the Friis transmission equation, which is still widely employed. In 1958 he retired but continued as a research consultant to the Hewlett-Packard Company as a friend of David Packard. He held 31 U.S. patents.

Friis died on 15 June 1976, at age 83, of a stroke in Palo Alto, California.

Awards

Selected works
 Seventy Five Years in an Exciting World, (1971)
 Antennas: Theory and Practice, (1952) – with Sergei A. Schelkunoff 
 Proceedings of the IRE, vol. 34, p. 254, (1946) – Friis transmission equation
 A New Directional Receiving System, (1925)
 High Frequency Amplifiers, (1924)

Work papers
The papers of Harald Trap Friis span the years 1921-1976. These documents are available to the public and are maintained at the Manuscript Division, Library of Congress, Washington, D.C.

References

Other sources
 

1893 births
1976 deaths
American electrical engineers
Radio pioneers
IEEE Medal of Honor recipients
Valdemar Poulsen Gold Medal recipients
Scientists at Bell Labs
Danish emigrants to the United States
People from Næstved Municipality
20th-century American engineers
Microwave engineers
American telecommunications engineers
Danish engineers